General elections were held on the Isle of Man on 22 November 2001 to elect members to the island's lower house: the House of Keys. The election was dominated by Independents, who won 22 of the 24 seats.

Results

By constituency

References

Isle of Man
General
Elections in the Isle of Man
Isle of Man
Isle of Man